Michele Luppi (born 7 April 1974) is an Italian musician, producer, and vocal coach.

Career

1990s
In 1994, Luppi joined his first band Mr. Pig. Michele debuted as frontman singer. Became a famous live act in Italy, performing songs from Mr. Big's album Lean Into It. In 1997 he started teaching singers in his studio MiLu’s Rock Lab and in Italian music schools, while developing a vocal method that is a core topic of his voice control workshops. In 1998, he obtained a diploma at Vocal Institute of Technology (VIT) and started to work as professional singer, composer and producer, in both live and studio sessions, next to artists as Reb Beach, Eric Martin, Gregg Giuffria, Maurizio Solieri, George Lynch, Doug Aldrich, Ian Paice and many others.

2000s
From 2002 to 2003 Luppi took part in Umberto Tozzi's World Tour as a backing vocalist and keyboard player. In August 2003, he joined Vision Divine with whom he released three albums: Stream of Consciousness (2004), the Stage Of Consciousness DVD (2005), The Perfect Machine (2005) and The 25th Hour (2007). He performed world tours with Vision Divine and other opening acts for artists as Dream Theater, Nightwish, Helloween, Children Of Bodom and many others until his departure from the band in 2008. In 2005 he released his first solo album Strive. In 2007 he started to collaborate with band Los Angeles and released albums Los Angeles (2007) featuring Giuffria on keyboards, and Neverland (2009) for Frontiers Records featuring song Nowhere to Hide, composed by Michele and George Lynch (Dokken, Lynch Mob).

In 2008 Luppi established melodic metal band Killing Touch. He wrote and produced all materials for their debut album One of a Kind (2009). In 2009 he collaborated in songwriting of Solieri’s first solo album Volume I and performed as opening act with Maurizio Solieri Band for Italian concerts of Deep Purple Tour and for AC/DC concert in Udine. The song "Please Believe Me" in 2015 become part of soundtrack of Italian movie One More Day by director Andrea Preti.

2010s
2010 – joined the Finnish metal band Thaurorod for the "Power of Metal" European Tour Tour with Symphony X and Nevermore and played major European festivals. He took part as singer and keyboard player in a major event in Bologna: The Ultimate World Guitar Exhibition"" with artists such as Yngwie Malmsteen, Glenn Hughes, Gregg Bissonette, Derek Sherinian and Neil Murray.

2011 – became singer of Italian power metal band Secret Sphere and in 2012 released the album Portrait Of A Dying Heart. Secret Sphere performed at Wacken Open Air 2013 and three of their songs were included in the official Wacken DVD.  In 2015 Secret Sphere re-released their classic album A Time Never Come completely re-recorded and arranged with the current line up with Michele on vocals. He also established his own band, the Michele Luppi Band where he sings and plays bass touring all around Italy.
 
2015 – He joined Whitesnake band as backing vocals and keyboard player for “The Purple Tour” touring worldwide.

Discography

Vision Divine

 Stream of Consciousness - (2004)
 Stage of Consciousness (live) - (2005)
 The Perfect Machine - (2005)
 The 25th Hour - (2007)

Michele Luppi's Heaven

 Strive - (2005)

Los Angeles

 Los Angeles - (2007)
 Neverland - (2009)

Killing Touch

 One of a Kind - (2009)

Secret Sphere

 Portrait of a Dying Heart - (2012)
 A Time Never Come – 2015 edition - (2015)
 One Night in Tokyo (live) - (2016)
 The Nature of Time (2017)

Whitesnake

 The Purple Tour - (2018)
 Flesh & Blood - (2019)

References

1974 births
Living people
Whitesnake members
People from Carpi, Emilia-Romagna
Italian rock singers
Italian keyboardists
Italian record producers
Vision Divine members
Scarlet Records artists
Musicians from the Province of Modena